Rare Chandeliers is a collaborative mixtape by American rapper Action Bronson and American producer The Alchemist. It was released on November 15, 2012. Production was handled entirely by The Alchemist. On December 20, a remastered (320kbit/s MP3 quality) extended version was released for free, as well as a limited edition of Diamond Supply hoodies for sale.

Track listing
All tracks produced by The Alchemist.

References

2012 albums
Action Bronson albums
Collaborative albums
The Alchemist (musician) albums
Albums produced by the Alchemist (musician)